Guiana Island (or Guana Island) is an island off the northeast coast of Antigua, between the Parham Peninsula and Crump Island. It forms the southern coast of the North Sound, and is the fourth largest island of Antigua and Barbuda.

Flora and Fauna 
Island is a refuge for the Fallow Deer, Antigua's national animal.

History and development 
The island used to be owned by Allen Stanford, who was convicted of fraud in the United States. The Antiguan government has now sold the island and abutting mainland sites in a multimillion-dollar investment to  Chinese developers termed the YIDA Project as a semi-autonomous Special Economic Zone.

References

Private islands of Antigua and Barbuda
Saint Peter Parish, Antigua and Barbuda